The Roman Catholic Diocese of Jataí is a diocese located in the city of Jataí in the Ecclesiastical province of Goiânia in Brazil.

History
On 21 June 1929 Pope Pius XI established the Territorial Prelature of Jataí from the Diocese of Goiás.  Pope Pius XII elevated the prelature to the Diocese of Jataí on 26 March 1956.

Bishops

Ordinaries
Prelates of Jataí
 Bishop Germán Vega Campón, O.S.A. (1941.04.19 – 1955.05.08)

Bishops of Jataí
 Bishop Abel Ribeiro Camelo (1957.01.17 – 1960.05.14), appointed Bishop of Goiás
 Bishop Benedito Domingos Vito Coscia, O.F.M. (1961.06.08 – 1999.02.24). Died 2008.04.30.
 Bishop Miguel Pedro Mundo (1999.02.24 – 1999.05.19). Died in office.
 Bishop Aloísio Hilário de Pinho, F.D.P. (1999.12.22 – 2009.12.16)
 Bishop José Luis Majella Delgado, C.Ss.R. (2010.03.06 – 2014.05.28), appointed Archbishop of Pouso Alegre, Minas Gerais
 Bishop Nelio Domingos Zortea (2015 – )

Auxiliary bishops of Jatai
Miguel Pedro Mundo (1978.03.06 – 1999.02.24), appointed Bishop here
Mathias William Schmidt, O.S.B. (1972.06.10 - 1976.05.14), appointed Bishop of Ruy Barbosa (Rui Barbosa), Bahia

References

Jatai
Christian organizations established in 1929
Jatai, Roman Catholic Diocese of
Jatai